The 2012 AIBA Women's World Boxing Championships was held in Qinhuangdao, China from May 9 to May 22, 2012.

For the first time, this world championship served as a qualifier for the 2012 Summer Olympics. 305 boxers participated from 70 countries.

Olympic qualification summary

Medal summary

Medal table

Medalists

Results

Light flyweight
26 boxers participating in this category.

Flyweight
55 boxers participating in this category that qualifies for the Olympics.

Finals

Section 1

Section 2

Section 3

Section 4

Bantamweight
32 boxers participating in this category.

Featherweight
28 boxers participating in this category.

Note - quarter-finalist  was disqualified from the championships in 2022 after a retest of her doping sample revealed the presence of Clenbuterol.

Lightweight
58 boxers participating in this category that qualifies for the Olympics.
Finals

Section 1

Section 2

Section 3

Section 4

Light welterweight
26 boxers participating in this category.

Welterweight
20 boxers participating in this category.

Middleweight
40 boxers participating in this category that qualifies for the Olympics.
Finals

Section 1

Section 2

Section 3

Section 4

Light heavyweight
12 boxers participating in this category.

Heavyweight
8 boxers participating in this category.

Participating countries
305 competitors from 70 countries will participate.

  (3)
  (2)
  (2)
  (7)
  (1)
  (2)
  (4)
  (1)
  (6)
  (4)
  (8)
  (10)
  (2)
  (1)
  (5)
  (3)
  (2)
  (1)
  (3)
  (9)
  (7)
 
  (4)
  (3)
  (2)
  (1)
  (10)
  (10)
  (2)
  (3)
  (1)
  (3)
  (2)
  (6)
  (10)
  (6)
  (1)
  (3)
  (4)
  (3)
  (2)
  (3)
  (7)
  (3)
  (6)
  (4)
  (3)
  (7)
  (1)
  (2)
  (8)
  (10)
  (5)
  (1)
  (1)
  (3)
  (3)
  (3)
  (3)
  (6)
  (3)
  (3)
  (6)
  (5)
  (3)
  (10)
  (10)
  (9)
  (4)
  (7)
  (7)

References

External links
 

Women World Boxing Championships
Women's World Boxing Championships
Women World Boxing Championships 2012
B
2012 in women's boxing